Tal Anderson Field is a baseball park located in Omaha, Nebraska. It is the home field of the Omaha Mavericks of the NCAA Division I Summit League. Opened in 2021, the park is located in Omaha's Midtown Omaha neighborhood. It is named for former Omaha baseball standout, Tal Anderson. The venue has a capacity of 1,500 people for baseball.

Naming
Tal Anderson, for whom the venue is named, caught for the Mavericks program in the 1950s.

See also
 List of NCAA Division I baseball venues

References

External links
Tal Anderson Field

College baseball venues in the United States
Baseball venues in Nebraska
Sports venues completed in 2021
Omaha Mavericks baseball
2021 establishments in Nebraska